Tomki may refer to:
Tomki, California
Tomki, New South Wales
Tomki, Poland